Willis David Hoover was born in Jackson County, Missouri and raised in Lamoni, Iowa and Shenandoah, Iowa.   After starting out as a coffee house folk singer as a teenager, Hoover moved to Nashville in the 1960s and became a songwriter.  His songs were recorded by Tina Turner, Eddy Arnold and country music outlaws Tompall Glaser and Waylon Jennings.  He won an ASCAP Award for music written for the motion picture, "...tick...tick...tick..." After losing or forgetting his first and middle names, Hoover became a recording artist for Monument Records, Epic Records, and Elektra Records in the late 1960s and early 1970s.  His recordings for Elektra were released in 2003 by Kinky Friedman's Sphincter Records label.

After retiring from the music industry, Hoover became a writer.  He had "Picks!" published in 1995 and "North Shore" in 2005.

LP discography
 "Hoover" (1970)
 "The Lost Outlaw Album" (2003)

External links
 Sphincter Records Bio about Hoover
 "Picks!" by Will Hoover from Backbeat Books

People from Jackson County, Missouri
American country singer-songwriters
American male singer-songwriters
Year of birth missing (living people)
Living people
Singer-songwriters from Missouri
Country musicians from Missouri